Neil Richardson may refer to:

Neil Richardson (composer)
Neil Richardson (footballer)
Neil Richardson, president of the Methodist Conference for 2003